Schönauer, Schoenauer may refer to:

 Alex Schoenauer (born 1976, El Bolson, Argentina), an Argentine-American professional mixed martial arts (MMA) fighter
 Detlev Schönauer (born 1953, Mainz), German Kabarettist
 Friedrich Schönauer (1904, Altenplos - 1950), German politician
 Helmuth Schönauer (born 1953, Innsbruck), Austrian writer and librarian
 Hermann Schoenauer (born 1950), rector
 Marianne Schönauer, née Schifferes (1920, Vienna - 1999, Vienna), an Austrian actress of Jewish descent (paternal Jewish)
 Thomas Schönauer (born 1953, Düsseldorf), German sculptor and artist

Variant surnames 
 Vladimir Šenauer (born 1930), former Croatian football player

See also 
 Mannlicher–Schönauer
 6.5×54mm Mannlicher–Schönauer
 9.5×57mm Mannlicher–Schoenauer

German-language surnames
Surnames of Czech origin
German toponymic surnames